Patrick Baxter may refer to:
 Patrick Baxter (politician) (1891–1959), Irish politician
 Patrick Baxter (serial killer) (born 1969), American serial killer and rapist